I due assi del guantone (Italian for "The two aces of boxing") is a 1971 comedy film directed by Mariano Laurenti and starring the comic duo Franco and Ciccio.

Plot

Cast 
 
 Franco Franchi as  Franco Marsala
Ciccio Ingrassia as  Ciccio Trapani
Mario Carotenuto as  Amleto Rossetti
Ave Ninchi as  Adele Rossetti
 Gino Milli as  Enzo
Paola Tedesco as  Marisa
Umberto D'Orsi as  Sor Giovanni
Giulio Rinaldi as  Cesare De Cesari aka "Golia"
Tiberio Murgia as  The Traffic Cop
Luca Sportelli as  The Grocer 
Enzo Andronico as  The Boxing Coach
Nino Vingelli as A Restaurateur 
Ada Pometti  as The Chemist  
Fulvio Mingozzi as The Tour Guide

See also   
 List of Italian films of 1971

References

External links

I due assi del guantone at Variety Distribution

1970s buddy comedy films
Italian buddy comedy films
Films directed by Mariano Laurenti
Films scored by Piero Umiliani
Italian boxing films
1970s sports comedy films
1971 comedy films
1971 films
Italian sports comedy films
1970s Italian films